Changing Faces – The Very Best of 10cc and Godley & Creme is a compilation album that included the hits of 10cc and Godley & Creme, the first album to include both bands.

Release and reception
The album featured 16 tracks including a newly remixed version of "Snack Attack" by Godley & Creme, that originally featured on their 1981 album Ismism. The track was also issued as a single with an edit of "Wet Rubber Soup" from The History Mix Volume 1 (1985) on the B-side. The single failed to chart.

The album was very successful in the UK reaching No.4 and achieving platinum status for selling over 300,000 copies. It was also the catalyst to Polydor conducting market research to see if the public would welcome a new album from the band which eventually resulted in ...Meanwhile (1992).

The cover 
The cover featured a composite of all the band's faces placed on top of each other - a reference to the famous morphing video for Godley & Creme's "Cry" single from 1985.

Track listing 
 10cc "Dreadlock Holiday" (Eric Stewart, Graham Gouldman) 1978
 10cc "The Wall Street Shuffle" (Stewart, Gouldman) 1974
 Godley & Creme "Under Your Thumb" (Kevin Godley, Lol Creme) 1981
 10cc "Life Is a Minestrone" (Creme, Stewart) 1975
 Godley & Creme "An Englishman in New York" (Godley, Creme) 1979
 10cc "Art for Art's Sake" (Stewart, Gouldman) 1975
 10cc "Donna" (Godley, Creme) 1972
 Godley & Creme "Snack Attack (Remix)" 1987 (Original Version 1981)
 Godley & Creme "Cry" (Godley, Creme) 1985
 10cc "The Things We Do for Love" (Stewart, Gouldman) 1976
 Godley & Creme "Wedding Bells" (Godley, Creme) 1981
 10cc "I'm Mandy Fly Me" (Stewart, Gouldman, Godley) 1976
 10cc "Good Morning Judge" (Stewart, Gouldman) 1977
 10cc "Rubber Bullets" (Godley, Creme, Gouldman) 1973
 Godley & Creme "Save a Mountain for Me" (Godley, Creme) 1982
 10cc "I'm Not in Love" (Stewart, Gouldman) 1975

The video 
A compilation of videos was assembled and released in 1988. 
 10cc "Dreadlock Holiday"
 10cc "The Wall Street Shuffle" (Live)
 Godley & Creme "An Englishman in New York"
 Godley & Creme "Wedding Bells"
 10cc "The Things We Do for Love"
 10cc "Good Morning Judge"
 Godley & Creme "Golden Boy"
 10cc "I'm Mandy Fly Me"
 10cc "Feel the Love"
 10cc "I'm Not in Love" (Live)
 Godley & Creme – History Mix – featuring "Cry" (Various clips of the promos directed by and featuring them and 10cc)

The video has since been repackaged as the companion to the Greatest Hits ... And More compilation from 2006, available as a DVD.

References 

10cc albums
1987 greatest hits albums